Joseph Léo Charron C.PP.S. is an American prelate of the Roman Catholic Church.  Charron served as bishop of the Diocese of Des Moines in Iowa from 1994 to 2007 and as an auxiliary bishop of the Archdiocese of Saint Paul and Minneapolis in Minnesota from 1990 to 1994.

Biography

Early life 
Joseph Charron was born in Redfield, South Dakota, on December 30, 1939. He is one of eight children. Charron made his religious profession as a member of the Missionaries of the Precious Blood on August 15, 1961. Charron received his Bachelor of Theology degree in 1963 and his Master of Theology degree in 1966 from the University of Dayton. He earned a Licentiate in Sacred Theology at Lateran University in Rome in 1968, and a doctorate at the Academia Alfonsiana in Rome in 1970.

Priesthood 
On June 3, 1967, Charron was ordained to the priesthood for the Missionaries of the Sacred Blood by Bishop Edward A. McCarthy in Carthagena, Ohio. In 1970, Charron served as an assistant professor of theology at St. John's University in St. Joseph, Minnesota.  In 1976, he became assistant general secretary and associate general secretary of the United States Catholic Conference and the National Conference of Catholic Bishops. In 1979, Charron was appointed provincial director of the Kansas City Province of the Missionaries of the Precious Blood.  Charron returned to St. John's University in 1987, becoming an adjunct professor of theology.

Auxiliary Bishop of Saint Paul and Minneapolis 
On November 12, 1989, Pope John Paul II appointed Charron as an auxiliary bishop of the Archdiocese of Saint Paul and Minneapolis and titular bishop of Bencenna. He was consecrated on January 25, 1990 by Archbishop John Roach.

Bishop of Des Moines 
On January 21, 1994, John Paul II appointed Charron as bishop of the Diocese of Des Moines. On September 19, 2003, Charron permanently suspended three diocese priest from ministry due to sexual abuse allegations: Albert Wilwerding, John Ryan, and Richard Wagner. Charron was following the recommendations of an internal committee that had recommended their dismissal and ultimate laicization.

On April 10, 2007, Pope Benedict XVI accepted Charron's resignation due to poor health as bishop of Des Moines.  Charron cited a chronic form of an inflammatory disease.

See also

 Catholic Church hierarchy
 Catholic Church in the United States
 Historical list of the Catholic bishops of the United States
 List of Catholic bishops of the United States
 Lists of patriarchs, archbishops, and bishops

References

 

1939 births
Living people
University of Dayton alumni
Alphonsian Academy alumni
20th-century Roman Catholic bishops in the United States
21st-century Roman Catholic bishops in the United States
People from Redfield, South Dakota
Roman Catholic Archdiocese of Saint Paul and Minneapolis
Roman Catholic bishops of Des Moines
Religious leaders from Minnesota
Catholics from South Dakota